Vincent D. Rougeau (born June 17, 1963) is an American legal scholar serving as the 33rd President of the College of the Holy Cross in Worcester, Massachusetts. He is the college's first lay and first Black president. Before assuming the position, Rougeau served as Dean of Boston College Law School.

Early life and education 
Vincent D. Rougeau was born on June 17, 1963, in Miami Beach, Florida, to Catholic parents. His father, Weldon Rougeau, was actively involved in the American Civil Rights Movement while his mother worked at a hospital.

Rougeau received his bachelor of arts degree from Brown University in 1985 and his juris doctor from Harvard Law School in 1988.

Career 
In 1997, Rougeau joined the faculty of  Notre Dame Law School as a visiting associate professor. He later became a tenured professor and served as the university's Associate Dean for Academic Affairs from 1999 to 2002.

In 2011, Rougeau was appointed Dean of Boston College Law School. He served in that capacity until July 2021, when he assumed the role of President at the College of the Holy Cross. Upon his appointment, Rougeau identified increasing diversity and the college's relationship with the city of Worcester as among his strategic priorities.

In January 2021, Rougeau was inducted as president of the Association of American Law Schools.

Publications

References

20th-century African-American people
20th-century American lawyers
20th-century Roman Catholics
21st-century African-American people
21st-century American lawyers
21st-century Roman Catholics
1963 births
African-American academics
African-American Catholics
African-American lawyers
American university and college faculty deans
Boston College faculty
Brown University alumni
Catholics from Massachusetts
Harvard Law School alumni
Deans of law schools in the United States
Living people
Presidents of the College of the Holy Cross
University of Notre Dame faculty